Russell Whelan (2 December 1914 – 21 August 1981) was an  Australian rules footballer who played with Hawthorn in the Victorian Football League (VFL).

Notes

External links 

1914 births
1981 deaths
Australian rules footballers from Victoria (Australia)
Hawthorn Football Club players